The Six Parts Seven/The Black Keys is a split-EP by Ohio bands The Six Parts Seven and The Black Keys. Released in 2003, it featured "A Blueprint Of Something Never Finished" by The Six Parts Seven and three live tracks from The Black Keys.  The live tracks are from a performance at WMBR on 16 May 2003.

Track listing
 "A Blueprint of Something Never Finished" (The Six Parts Seven)
 "The Moan" (The Black Keys)
 "Thickfreakness" (The Black Keys)
 "Yearnin'" (The Black Keys)

Personnel
Allen Karpinski - track 1; guitar
Jay Karpinski - track 1; drums
Tim Gerak - track 1; guitar
Dan Auerbach - track 2, 3, 4; vocals, guitar
Patrick Carney - track 2, 3, 4; drums

References

External links
SuicideSqueeze.net

2003 EPs
The Black Keys albums
The Six Parts Seven albums
Collaborative albums
Split EPs
Suicide Squeeze Records albums